Mohammad Gholami (born February 13, 1983) is an Iranian football player who plays for Sepidrood in the Persian Gulf Pro League. He usually plays in the striker position.

Club career
He began his professional career in Malavan football club. He showed consistent displays for Malavan throughout the 2005–06 Iran Pro League season, scoring 7 goals. Several times he saved the club from losing by scoring in the last seconds of the match. The most famous example of this is in the season where he shocked Esteghlal by scoring in the 94th minute in Azadi Stadium in a game that ended 3–3. He was signed to a one-year contract with Damash Gilan on 19 June 2011 and was one of Damash's key players in the 2011–12 season. He scored eight goals in 29 matches. After spending one season at Damash, he joined Iran Pro League champions, Sepahan on 1 June 2012 with a two-year contract.

In August 2022 he retired from his professional career after helping Damash to promote to Iranian football's 2nd division.

Club career statistics

International career

He made his international debut against China  in September 2010 under Afshin Ghotbi, where he scored his first international goal.

International goals

Scores and results list Iran's goal tally first.

Honours
Sepahan
Hazfi Cup (1): 2012–13

References

Iran Pro League Stats

Iranian footballers
Association football forwards
Malavan players
Pas players
People from Bandar-e Anzali
1983 births
Living people
Steel Azin F.C. players
Damash Gilan players
Sepahan S.C. footballers
2011 AFC Asian Cup players
Iran international footballers
Iranian people of Talysh descent
Persian Gulf Pro League players
Talysh people
Sportspeople from Gilan province